Maesobotrya is a genus of flowering plant belonging to the  family Phyllanthaceae first described as a genus in 1879. It is native to sub-Saharan Africa. It is dioecious, with male and female flowers on separate plants.

Species

Formerly included
moved to: Antidesma Protomegabaria

References

Flora of Africa
Phyllanthaceae
Phyllanthaceae genera
Dioecious plants